The 1416 Yellow River flood was a natural disaster affecting the area around Kaifeng, China, during the early Ming dynasty. The flood spilled over into fourteen other counties and seriously disturbed the Huai River.

References

History of Kaifeng
Disasters in Ming dynasty
Kaifeng Flood, 1416
Yellow River Flood, 1416
Yellow River floods
15th-century floods